The 2004–05 Danish 1st Division season was the 60th season of the Danish 1st Division league championship and the 19th consecutive as a second tier competition governed by the Danish Football Association.

The division-champion and runner-up promoted to the 2005–06 Danish Superliga. The teams in the 14th, 15th and 16th places relegated between the 2nd Division east and west, based on location.

Table

Top goalscorers

See also
 2004–05 in Danish football
 2004–05 Danish Superliga
 2005–06 Danish 1st Division

External links
 Danish Football Association's database
 Standings
 Fixtures
  Standings at haslund.info

Danish 1st Division seasons
Denmark
2004–05 in Danish football